Sutti Veerabhadra Rao or Mamidipalli Veerabhadra Rao was a very popular south Indian film actor who played comedians and character artists, as well as a renowned radio and theater artist.

Early life
Veerabhadra Rao was the only son, and had two younger sisters. He hailed from the East Godavari District (born at Ayanapuram) of Andhra Pradesh, and moved to Vijayawada due to his father's job. He did his schooling in 'AKTP school' and graduated from Andhra University, through 'SRR College', Vijayawada.

Career
Suthi Veerabhadra Rao was one half of the famous "Sutti Janta", the other being Velu. He was a popular Radio and Theater Artist from 1970–1980. He entered the film industry in 1981, and became popular with Naalugu Sthambaalata in 1982. Until his untimely death due to heart attack, at the age of 41, he acted in 200+ films.

Radio and theatre career
Veerabhadra Rao was interested in acting right from his childhood, he used to act in stage plays at school level. During his graduation days at SRR College, Vijayawada, he teamed with Jandhyala who was his classmate, and together, they participated in many competitions at university level. This team went on to become one of the hit teams in film industry with respect to comedy.

After Graduation, with love for theatre, he went on to become an employee of All India Radio (AIR), Vijayawada. While working there, he had staged many plays in Thummalapalli Kalakshetram, and Veledandla Hanumantharaya Grandhalayam, Vijayawada. He also participated in many plays that were broadcast from AIR. During his tenure with AIR, VJA, he worked with stalwarts of Telugu Theater and literature, like CSR Anajaneyulu, Vinnakota Ramanna Panthulu, Nanduri Subba Rao, C Rama Mohan Rao, Usha Sri, Vinnakota Vijayaram, Indrakanti Sreekanth Sarma, P Pandurangarao (Panduringa), Peri Kameswara Rao, Koka Sanjeeva Rao, A B Anand etc. Sri Balatranpu RajaniKantha Rao (Rajani) is instrumental for his entry into AIR. Sri Rajani would select his staff only if they could pronounce all the 56 letters of Telugu language, in a clear tone, with correct pronunciation and enunciation. His most popular stage play was Krishna Paksham presented at Konteru Nataka Parishath.

Film artist 
He entered the Telugu film industry in 1981, with the film Jatara. However, he got noticed in the industry in 1982, through the film Naalugu Sthambaalata by Jandhayla. He became famous in Tollywood for his lengthy dialogues. From 1982 to 1988, he acted in over 200 films. During this period, he played different kinds of roles.

He was the main character in many of the earlier films of Naresh and Rajendra Prasad. He was approached by few producers and directors for a guest role, with the belief that his presence would make the film a hit. As a result, there are many films where he is seen, sometimes, even without credits. During his short tenure, he acted with most of the heroes of his time. At the time of his death in 1988, he completed the shooting for the film Choopulu Kalisina Subhavela, but, the voice dubbing remained. Jandhyala gave his voice for the character.

Personal life

Veerabhadra Rao married Sekhari in 1970 and has two children, a son and a daughter. His daughter died in 2013 from cancer.

He was an avid reader of Literature in Telugu and English. He had his own personal library consisting of some of the books such as Veyi Padagalu and Srimad Bhagavatham. He also had a big collection of plays written in Telugu.

He used to donate huge amounts of money for the needy, and there were many beneficiaries from him. He led a simple life, helping others, and doing what he liked to do. He was religious.

Death 

While shooting for a song in the film Choopulu Kalisina Subhavela, there was a sprain on one of his legs. Being a diabetic, he could not recover immediately and was advised to take some rest, as he was working continuously for a long time.

He was admitted in a hospital for recovery. On 30 June 1988, he died of a drug-induced heart attack.

Filmography 
Some of his popular films are:

External links

1947 births
1988 deaths
Telugu male actors
Telugu comedians
20th-century Indian male actors
Male actors from Andhra Pradesh
Indian male film actors
Andhra University alumni
Indian male comedians
Male actors in Telugu cinema
20th-century comedians